Little Big Superstar is a Philippine reality - variety show for kids, that airs every Saturday afternoon on ABS-CBN.

It is a spin-off of Little Big Star, also with the same format, but only searched for singers. Now, Little Big Superstar is bigger and better as it is not just a singing contest, it is the search for the next kid superstar.

Format
Every week, the final list of contestants will be judged accordingly by our three sets of judges. The first will be the text voters who get 30% of the kid's final score, second will be the three resident judges who will see them weekly as they become the next superstar with 50% and thirdly, introducing the special invited jury which is open to everybody (they may vary from Kapamilya Stars to POP senders) who will use a specialized gadget, the clicker, that instantly determines the special jury's average scores, they get 20%.

The little stars will battle it out weekly in escalating musical skills, from concert performances to drama acting to dance showdown until only one kid will emerge as the Little Big Superstar.

Finalists

Super Three
First Honor/Little Big Superstar" "Mr. Heartsong" Ronald Jaimeer Humarang
Second Honor: "D beat boy" Joshua Cadelina
Third Honor: "Golden Voice" Trina Alcantara

Eliminated
"Singing Darling" Kristine Sanchez
"Star Princess" Aria Clemente
"Shining Sweetheart" Janet Japor
"Mr. Melody" Leo Anthony Padilla
"Music Belle" Jea Reyes
"Prince Charming" Kristofer Martin Dangculos
"Junior Heartthrob" Ysrael Carreon

Elimination chart

The Super Battle
Ronald Jaimeer became the Little Big Superstar grand champion, having 91.4%. Joshua Cadelina became second, having a score of 90%. Trina Alcantara became the 3rd honor, having 89.1%.

Judges/Guests
Angelika Dela Cruz - Judge
Louie Ocampo - Judge
Joyce Bernal - Judge
Randy Santiago - Judge
Wenn Deramas - Guest Judge
Bea Alonzo - Guest Host/Judge
Ryan Agoncillo - Guest Host

See also
 List of programs broadcast by ABS-CBN
 Little Big Star

References

External links
 ABS-CBN.com: Meet the Little Stars
 ABS-CBN.com: Little Big Superstar

Philippine reality television series
ABS-CBN original programming
2007 Philippine television series debuts
2007 Philippine television series endings
Filipino-language television shows
Television series about children